The Enoch Arden law is a legal precedent in the United States that grants a divorce or a legal exemption so that a person can remarry, if his or her spouse has been absent without explanation for a certain number of years, typically seven.

After seven years the missing spouse can be declared legally dead.

The "Enoch Arden doctrine" is named after Tennyson's 1864 melodrama Enoch Arden.

References

Divorce law
American legal terminology
Alfred, Lord Tennyson